Two for the Blues is an album by saxophonists Frank Foster and Frank Wess which was recorded in 1983 and released on the Pablo label the following year.

Reception

The AllMusic review by Scott Yanow said it "features Frank Foster (on tenor and soprano) and Frank Wess (tenor, flute and alto) at their best. ... this is an excellent showcase for the two Franks".

Track listing
All compositions by Frank Wess except where noted
 "Two for the Blues" (Neal Hefti) – 6:41
 "Send in the Clowns" (Stephen Sondheim) – 6:18
 "Your Beauty Is a Song of Love" – 4:12
 "But for the Likes of You" – 4:18
 "Heat of Winter" (Frank Foster) – 5:44
 "Nancy (with the Laughing Face)" (Jimmy Van Heusen, Phil Silvers) – 4:16
 "Spring Can Really Hang You Up the Most" (Fran Landesman, Tommy Wolf) – 5:03
 "A Time for Love" (Johnny Mandel, Paul Francis Webster) – 5:32
 "Bay Street" – 3:46

Personnel
Frank Foster – soprano saxophone, tenor saxophone
Frank Wess – alto saxophone, tenor saxophone, flute
Kenny Barron – piano
Rufus Reid – double bass
Marvin Smith – drums

References

Pablo Records albums
Frank Wess albums
Frank Foster (musician) albums
1984 albums